Star Wars (Original Motion Picture Soundtrack) is the soundtrack album to the 1977 film Star Wars, composed and conducted by John Williams and performed by the London Symphony Orchestra. Williams' score for Star Wars was recorded over eight sessions at Anvil Studios in Denham, England on March 5, 8–12, 15 and 16, 1977. The score was orchestrated by Williams, Herbert W. Spencer, Alexander Courage, Angela Morley, Arthur Morton and Albert Woodbury. Spencer orchestrated the scores for The Empire Strikes Back and Return of the Jedi. The score was recorded by engineer Eric Tomlinson and edited by Kenneth Wannberg, and the scoring sessions were produced by Star Wars director George Lucas and supervised by Lionel Newman, head of 20th Century Fox's music department.

The soundtrack album was released by 20th Century Records as a double-LP record in the United States in June 1977. The album's main title peaked at No. 10 on the Billboard Hot 100, with a disco version of the film's theme by Meco becoming a number one single hit in the United States in October 1977. The soundtrack album itself became the best-selling symphonic album of all time; it was certified Gold and Platinum by the Recording Industry Association of America, and won numerous accolades including an Academy Award, a Golden Globe Award, a BAFTA Award, and Grammy Awards in the categories of Best Original Score Written for a Motion Picture or a Television Special and Best Instrumental Composition (for the "Main Title"). It was also nominated for the Grammy Award for Album of the Year. In 2004, it was preserved by the Library of Congress into the National Recording Registry, calling it "culturally, historically, or aesthetically significant". In 2005, the American Film Institute named the original Star Wars soundtrack as the most memorable score of all time for an American film.

The Star Wars soundtrack saw subsequent reissues since its initial release. In 2016, the album was re-released by Sony Classical Records on vinyl, CD, and digital formats alongside Williams' other Star Wars soundtracks. The vinyl release is pressed on 180g vinyl, and features the original 20th Century Records logo. Unlike all of Sony Classical's previous releases, however, the vinyl version is a remastered version of the original 1977 release, not the Special Edition. Walt Disney Records remastered and reissued the soundtrack on vinyl LP on December 1, 2017, and on CD and digital formats on May 4, 2018.

Original 1977 release 
The original 1977 release of the soundtrack, entitled Star Wars - Original Soundtrack, included a poster of a painting by science fiction artist John Berkey, depicting the final battle over the Death Star from the film's end. The album was released as a double LP which was formatted for an autochanger record player; one disc had sides one and four with the other having sides two and three. This allowed a person to stack sides one and two on the player, then flip the stack over for sides three and four, allowing the listener to have over half an hour of uninterrupted music before they needed to flip the discs over.

Track listing
First release on LP by 20th Century Records. For the original soundtrack, Williams selected 75 minutes of music out of the 88 minute score. To provide musical variety, it did not follow the film's chronological order.

This track listing is also shared by Sony Classical's LP release in 2016, and Walt Disney Records' LP and CD releases in 2017 and 2018, respectively.

Total Time: 74:58

Personnel

 1st Violins: Neville Taweel (Leader), Richard Studt (Principal), Irvine Arditti (Principal), Brian Thomas (Sub-Principal), Stanley Castle, Sydney Colter, Dennis Gaines, Robert Retallick, C. Reuben, Norman Freeman, Max Weber, Robin Brightman, Brian Gaulton
 2nd Violins: Warwick Hill (Principal), Neil Watson (Co-Principal), Samuel Artis, William Brown, Thomas Cook, Terry Morton, Jack Steadman, Donald Stewart, Thomas Swift, David Williams, R. Clark, Geoffrey Creese, D. Llewellyn, Harry Nathan
 Violas: Alexander Taylor (Principal), Brian Clarke (Co-Principal), Peter Norriss (Sub-Principal), Patrick Hooley, Michael Mitchell, David Hume, William Sumpton, Patrick Vermont, William Krasnik, Eric Cuthbertson
 Cellos: Douglas Cummings (Principal), Maurice Meulien (Co-Principal), Ray Adams (Sub-Principal), Jack Long, Ken Law, Douglas Powrie, Francis Saunders, Clive Gillinson, Tom Storer, K. Glossop
 Double Basses: Bruce Mollinson (Principal), Arthur Griffiths (Sub-Principal), John Cooper, Gerald Newson, Pashanko Dimitroff, Goelson Neal
 Flutes: Richard Taylor (Principal), Lowry Sanders, Francis Nolan
 Oboes: Roger Lord (Principal), Anthony Camden (Principal)
 Clarinets: Jack Brymer (Principal), Ronald Moore, Roy Jowitt
 Bassoons: Robert Bourton (Principal), Peter Francis
 Horns: David Cripps (Principal), John Rooke (Asst. Principal), Anthony Chidell, Graham Warren, James Quaife, James Brown, S. Reading, J. Butterworth, Terry Johns
 Trumpets: Maurice Murphy (Principal), William Lang, Norman Archibald, R. Izen
 Trombones: Dennis Wick (Principal), Eric Crees (Principal), Frank Mathison
 Tuba: J. Fletcher (Principal), Steven Wick
 Timpani: Kurt-Hans Goedicke (Principal)
 Percussion: Michael Frye (Principal), Ray Northcott
 Harp: Renata Sheffel-Stein (Principal), J. Marson
 Piano/Celeste: Robert Noble (Principal), M. Round

Subsequent releases

Release history

1986 release
First release on CD by Polydor Records in 1986. It is identical in content and packaging to the LP release.

Disc one
"Main Title" – 5:21
"Imperial Attack" – 6:16
"Princess Leia's Theme"  – 4:22
"The Desert and the Robot Auction" – 2:52
"Ben's Death and TIE Fighter Attack" – 3:46
"The Little People Work" – 4:01
"Rescue of the Princess" – 4:46
"Inner City" – 4:13
"Cantina Band" – 2:45

Disc two
"The Land of the Sandpeople" – 2:49
"Mouse Robot and Blasting Off" – 4:01
"The Return Home" – 2:45
"The Walls Converge" – 4:32
"The Princess Appears" – 4:03
"The Last Battle" – 12:06
"The Throne Room and End Title" – 5:27

Star Wars Trilogy: The Original Soundtrack Anthology

In 1993, 20th Century Fox Film Scores released a four-CD box set containing music from the original Star Wars trilogy. This release marked the first time that the complete contents of the original double-LP releases of the scores from the first two films became available on CD. Disc one in the set was devoted to Star Wars, with further tracks on disc four.

Since every cue is recorded several times, usually with varying orchestral differences, the final decisions on what takes of cues are used and/or how they are edited to create the tracks was decided by the music editor Kenneth Wannberg. In the time between the original LP release and the Anthology's release, this breakdown was lost. Because of this, many takes of cues used on the Anthology are not the same. This is most obvious on the cue "The Throne Room". Also, the tracks were re-arranged to better follow their chronological order in the film.

The alternate version of the Star Wars Main Title can be heard in the end credits for Star Wars Episode IX: The Rise of Skywalker, and is included in the film's soundtrack.

1997 and 2004 Special Edition reissues
The 1997 and 2004 releases include the complete film score, including expanded and unreleased tracks.

2017 and 2018 Disney reissues 
Walt Disney Records reissued the original 1977 soundtrack album in digital formats and streaming services on January 1, 2017, and on LP record on December 1, 2017, to coincide with the film's fortieth anniversary that same year. The LP reissue featured a remastered soundtrack, hand-etched hologram art, and a 48-page book containing production photographs, liner notes, and essays on John Williams and the music of Star Wars.

Disney released a newly remastered edition of the original 1977 album program on CD, digital download, and streaming services on May 4, 2018. This remaster was newly assembled by Shawn Murphy and Skywalker Sound from the highest-quality master tapes available, rather than sourced from the existing 1977 album masters. On these reissues, the final track ("The Throne Room and End Title") is presented at the correct speed and pitch, having been sped up slightly on the original LP, CD, and 2016 Sony releases.

Compilations and rerecordings (Selection) 

Tracks of the soundtrack appear on various Best of Compilations and rerecordings by John Williams.

 1983: The Star Wars Trilogy (Return of the Jedi / The Empire Strikes Back / Star Wars)
 1990/2001: John Williams Conducts The Star Wars Trilogy

Accolades

Academy Award for Best Original Score (1977)
Golden Globe Award for Best Original Score (1977)
BAFTA Award for Best Film Music (1978)
Grammy Award for Best Score Soundtrack for Visual Media (1978)
Grammy Award for Best Instrumental Composition (1978) – for Main Title
Grammy Award for Best Pop Instrumental Performance (1978)
Saturn Award for Best Music (1977) – tied with Close Encounters of the Third Kind
AFI's Greatest American movie score of all time (2005)

Charts

Certifications

Original recording log 
The score for Star Wars was recorded over the span of eight days in the month of March 1977. The 1997 Special Edition soundtrack release by RCA Victor included a detailed look at the recording log for all the cues in the film.

See also
The Story of Star Wars
Music of Star Wars

References

Star Wars film soundtracks
John Williams soundtracks
Soundtrack
1977 soundtrack albums
1970s film soundtrack albums
Grammy Hall of Fame Award recipients
United States National Recording Registry recordings
London Symphony Orchestra soundtracks
RCA Victor soundtracks
Sony Classical Records soundtracks
20th Century Fox Records soundtracks
Grammy Award for Best Score Soundtrack for Visual Media
Walt Disney Records soundtracks
RSO Records soundtracks
United States National Recording Registry albums
Scores that won the Best Original Score Academy Award